The Concerns of a Citizen is a book written by the Governor of Michigan, George W. Romney, and published during his campaign for the Republican presidential nomination in January 1968.

External links
 Kirkus Review's review

1968 non-fiction books
American non-fiction books
George W. Romney
Political books